Jamawi bin Ja'afar is a Malaysian politician from UMNO. He was the Member of Sabah State Legislative Assembly for Kemabong from 2018 to 2020.

Politics 
He was the Youth Chief of UMNO Tenom Division and Youth Information Chief of UMNO. He quit UMNO in 2018 and then later joined WARISAN. In 2020, he quit WARISAN and rejoined UMNO.

Election result

References 

Malaysian politicians
21st-century Malaysian politicians
Malaysian Muslims
Place of birth missing (living people)
Independent politicians in Malaysia
United Malays National Organisation politicians
Sabah Heritage Party politicians
Members of the Sabah State Legislative Assembly
Malaysian people of Malay descent
Living people
Year of birth missing (living people)